Larrymania is an American reality television series that premiered on October 7, 2012, on Universo. The series follows Mexican-American singer Larry Hernandez as he navigates through his musical career and juggles family life.

On May 9, 2019, Telemundo announced that the series has been renewed for an eighth season. The season premiered on September 15, 2019.

Production 
The series was announced at the 2012-2013 mun2 Upfront. Production for the third season began in February 2014. The series was renewed for a fifth season on February 3, 2016 with production beginning the month before. A sixth season was announced on August 27, 2017. On May 10, 2018, Telemundo announced that the series has been renewed for a seventh season. Season 7 premiered on September 30, 2018.

Episodes

References

External links 
 

Spanish-language television shows
2010s American reality television series
2012 American television series debuts
2020s American reality television series